Eenhana Airport  is an airport serving Eenhana, in the Ohangwena Region of Namibia.

See also
List of airports in Namibia
Transport in Namibia

References

External links
OpenStreetMap - Eenhana
OurAirports - Eenhana

Airports in Namibia